Mary Bertie, Duchess of Ancaster and Kesteven (died 19 October 1793), formerly Mary Panton, was the second wife of Peregrine Bertie, 3rd Duke of Ancaster and Kesteven. She was the daughter of Thomas Panton of Newmarket (1697-1782), who was an equerry to King George II and master of the Thurlow Hunt, and his wife Priscilla (though she may have been illegitimate).

The duke's first wife, Elizabeth Blundell, died in 1743.  Mary Panton married the duke on 27 November 1750. They had six children:

Lady Mary Catherine Bertie (14 April 1754 – 12 April 1767)
Peregrine Thomas Bertie, Marquess of Lindsey (21 May 1755 – 12 December 1758)
An unnamed son, who was born and died on 14 September 1759
Robert Bertie, 4th Duke of Ancaster and Kesteven (1756–1779)
Priscilla Barbara Elizabeth Bertie, Baroness Willoughby de Eresby (16 February 1761 – 29 December 1828)
Lady Georgina Charlotte Bertie (7 August 1761 – 1838), married George Cholmondeley, 1st Marquess of Cholmondeley and had children.

Following her marriage to the duke, Mary Panton's father Thomas obtained the post of Master of the King's Running Horses, and his son, also Thomas, later inherited this position.

In 1757, Sir Joshua Reynolds painted the couple, and another portrait by Reynolds of the duchess was painted between 1765 and 1771. A watercolour miniature, by John Smart, dating to 1763, is held by the Nelson-Atkins Museum of Art.

From 1761 to 1793, the duchess held the position of Mistress of the Robes to Charlotte of Mecklenburg-Strelitz, Queen Charlotte. On the birth of the future King William IV of the United Kingdom, the duchess recommended as wet-nurse a woman called Sarah Tuting, who was later acknowledged as her father's mistress.

The duchess died in Italy.

References

1793 deaths
Ancaster and Kesteven
Mistresses of the Robes
Court of George III of the United Kingdom
Household of Charlotte of Mecklenburg-Strelitz